is a Japanese tokusatsu drama in Toei Company's Kamen Rider Series, being the thirteenth series in the Heisei period run and the twenty-second overall. It began airing on September 4, 2011, the week following the conclusion of Kamen Rider OOO, joining Kaizoku Sentai Gokaiger and then Tokumei Sentai Go-Busters in the Super Hero Time lineup.

The series commemorates not only the Kamen Rider Series' 40th anniversary but also the 50th anniversary of spaceflight, which began with Yuri Gagarin's flight in 1961. As with the two previous series, the protagonist of Fourze made his debut in the annual summer film of the show's direct predecessor, appearing in Kamen Rider OOO Wonderful: The Shogun and the 21 Core Medals.

Production

The Kamen Rider Fourze trademark was registered by Toei on April 18, 2011.

Fourze was written by Kazuki Nakashima, known for his screenplays of Oh! Edo Rocket and Gurren Lagann. The creature designer was Kia Asamiya, known for his artwork for the manga Martian Successor Nadesico and Silent Möbius. Koichi Sakamoto, known for his work on the American Power Rangers franchise, served as the series' main director after his work on the Kamen Rider W films and several episodes of Kaizoku Sentai Gokaiger.

Story

Amanogawa High School has become the center of strange happenings, and things only get stranger when the bad boy-styled transfer student Gentaro Kisaragi attempts to make friends in his way, reuniting with childhood friend and self-professed space travel otaku Yuki Jojima, all while gaining the ire of loner Kengo Utahoshi. When the campus becomes overrun with monstrous constructs called Zodiarts, Kengo and Yuki attempt to use the strange devices they have found in the Rabbit Hatch lunar base that they access through a locker in an off-limits part of campus to fight them. However, Gentaro interferes in their plans, in part due to Kengo's body being unable to handle the strains of battle, and uses the devices to transform into Fourze. Upon learning of other heroes called Kamen Riders, Gentaro creates the Kamen Rider Club whose membership includes Yuki, Kengo, the school's queen bee Miu Kazashiro, Miu's jock boyfriend Shun Daimonji, garishly styled social butterfly JK and goth girl Tomoko Nozama. Later joined by Ryusei Sakuta, another transfer student who transforms into Kamen Rider Meteor, and their teacher Mr. Chuta Ohsugi, the Kamen Rider Club and Kamen Rider Fourze learn of the Horoscopes, an evolved group of Zodiarts who have been orchestrating events on the school grounds to build up their ranks. As the battle escalates, the Horoscopes set their motions to the final phase of their master plan before Kengo discovers his true existence.

Episodes

The titles of episodes of Kamen Rider Fourze consist of four kanji that can be read together to form a full statement.

Films
Gentaro Kisaragi made his debut in Kamen Rider OOOs third film, Kamen Rider OOO Wonderful: The Shogun and the 21 Core Medals.

Movie War Mega Max

A crossover film between Kamen Rider OOO and Kamen Rider Fourze in the same vein as the Movie War 2010 and Movie War Core films, titled , was released in Japanese theatres on December 10, 2011. The guest star for the Fourze portion was Hello! Project member Erina Mano, who portrayed Nadeshiko Misaki who transforms into Kamen Rider Nadeshiko, the first schoolgirl Kamen Rider. The events of the movie took place between episodes 14 and 15.

Super Hero Taisen

 is a film which features a crossover between the characters of the Kamen Rider and Super Sentai Series, featuring the protagonists of Kamen Rider Decade and Kaizoku Sentai Gokaiger, alongside the casts of Fourze and Tokumei Sentai Go-Busters as well. The events of the movie took place between episodes 24 and 25.

Space, Here We Come!

 is the main theatrical release for Kamen Rider Fourze, released on August 4, 2012, alongside the film for Tokumei Sentai Go-Busters. The film features the evil  siblings composed of the older brother  and the younger sister , who are based on the heroes of Space Ironmen Kyodain. It also featured the first on-screen appearance of the 14th Heisei Kamen Rider: Kamen Rider Wizard. The events of the movie took place between episodes 38 and 39.

Movie War Ultimatum

 was released on December 8, 2012, as the annual winter "Movie War" film. In the portion featuring the cast and characters of Kamen Rider Fourze, the story takes place five years after the events of the series. Both Erina Mano and Mikie Hara return to reprise their roles while Kenta Suga guest stars as Saburo Kazeta of a school club called the Monster Alliance who can transform into Sanagiman. The other guest stars for the Fourze portion include Rika Adachi, Kasumi Yamaya, and Toshiya Toyama.

Super Hero Taisen Z

 is a film released in Japan on April 27, 2013 which features the first crossover between characters of Toei's three main Tokusatsu franchises, Kamen Rider, Super Sentai, and the Space Sheriff Series representing the Metal Hero Series as a whole. The protagonists of Space Sheriff Gavan: The Movie, Tokumei Sentai Go-Busters, and Kaizoku Sentai Gokaiger are featured, but the casts of Kamen Rider Wizard, Zyuden Sentai Kyoryuger, and Kamen Rider Fourze also participate in the film. Sota Fukushi, Kenta Suga, Kohki Okada, and Ayumi Kinoshita reprise their roles voicing Kamen Rider Fourze, Inazuman, Groundain, and Skydain respectively.

Heisei Generations Final

A Movie War film, titled  was released on December 9, 2017. Along the casts of Kamen Rider Build and Kamen Rider Ex-Aid, Shu Watanabe and Ryosuke Miura (Kamen Rider OOO), Sota Fukushi (Kamen Rider Fourze), Gaku Sano (Kamen Rider Gaim), and Shun Nishime (Kamen Rider Ghost) reprised their respective roles.

Video game
A port of Kamen Rider: Climax Heroes titled  was released for both the PlayStation Portable and Nintendo Wii during Winter 2011. In addition to adding Kamen Rider Fourze to the game, the Shōwa Riders (e.g., Kamen Rider #1 & Kamen Rider Black RX) were added as playable characters.

Manga adaptation
A manga adaptation of Kamen Rider Fourze, written and illustrated by MegaMan NT Warrior artist Ryo Takamisaki, was first published in the February issue of CoroCoro Comic Special.

Novel
, written by Hideaki Tsukada, is part of a series of spin-off novel adaptions of the Heisei Era Kamen Riders. The events of the novel took place after the final episode. The novel was released on February 28, 2014.

Crossover with Crayon Shin-chan
Four short crossover episodes, collectively titled , between Kamen Rider Fourze and Crayon Shin-chan were shown in each show's time slots during April 2012 to promote their respective series' new films: Kamen Rider × Super Sentai: Super Hero Taisen and Crayon Shin-chan: The Storm Called!: Me and the Space Princess. The characters crossover in two episodes of each respective series. The story follows Shin-chan teaming up with Kamen Rider Fourze in order to go to space and rescue Shin's younger sister who had been taken to Planet Himawari to become its princess. The first and fourth episodes feature both anime and live-action while the second and third were entirely animated.

Episodes

Televi-Kun DVDs
The Hyper Battle DVD for Fourze is titled . Gentaro aims to become friends with Kamen Rider Amazon to obtain the Clear Drill Switch, which has crash-landed in the Amazon River.

 is a DVD packaged with the July 2012 issue of Televi-Kun magazine. The issue also comes with a poster with the information described in the DVD. The DVD is set before the Hyper Battle DVD, and features the content normally found in the Hyper Battle DVD (explaining the powers and weapons of the Kamen Riders), explained as Tachibana, with Ryusei and Gentaro's help, gathers the data of the 40 Astroswitches to find out what and where the mysterious mass of Cosmic Energy is.

Climax Episode
 is the director's cut version of the combined episodes 31 & 32. It was released on DVD and Blu-ray on October 21, 2012.

Final Episode
 is the director's cut version of the last two episodes. It was released on DVD and Blu-ray on February 21, 2013.

Cast
 : 
 : 
 : 
 : 
 : 
 : 
 : 
 : 
 : 
 : 
 : 
 : 
 : 
 : 
 : 
 : 
 : 
 Narration, :

Guest cast

 : 
 : 
 : 
 : 
 : 
 : 
 Man at kick boxing gym (21, 22): 
 : 
 Members of light music club (26): 
 
 
 
 
 
 Member of light music club (26): tatsuo (of everset)
 Member of light music club (26), JK's father (Young) (35): Ryo (of defspiral)
 Member of light music club (26): Masaki (of defspiral)
 Member of light music club (26): AYANO (of FULL AHEAD)
 : 
 Yuki's father (43, 44): 
 :

Songs
Opening theme
 "Switch On!"
 Lyrics: Shoko Fujibayashi
 Composition & Arrangement: tatsuo (of everset)
 Artist: 
Anna Tsuchiya decided to perform the opening theme for Kamen Rider Fourze after her young son became a fan of Kamen Rider OOO and because of her own fond memories of watching Kamen Rider Series shows as a child herself. A symphonic variation titled "Switch On! Orchestra Version" was played in the final two episodes.
Insert themes
 "Giant Step"
 Lyrics: Shoko Fujibayashi
 Composition & Arrangement: Shuhei Naruse
 Artist: Astronauts (May'n & Yoshiharu Shiina)
 Episodes: 6-16, 18, 19, 23-25
Astronauts is a special band formed by May'n and former Surface vocalist Yoshiharu Shiina for Kamen Rider Fourze.
 "Shooting Star"
 Lyrics: Shoko Fujibayashi
 Composition & Arrangement: tatsuo (of everset)
 Artist: everset
 Episodes: 16-18, 21, 22, 26, 29
 "Shooting Star" is Kamen Rider Meteor's theme song. The band everset previously contributed to the Kamen Rider Series as being Kamen Rider Ws fictional Galveston 19.
 "Bounce Back"
 Lyrics: Shoko Fujibayashi
 Composition & Arrangement: 
 Artist: Southern (Minami Kuribayashi & Yosuke Yamashita)
 Episodes: 20-22, 31
 "Bounce Back" is the theme song for Kamen Rider Fourze Magnet States. SoutherN is a special band formed by Minami Kuribayashi and former NovaQuorb vocalist Yosuke Yamashita.
 "ENDLESS PLAY"
 Lyrics: Shoko Fujibayashi
 Composition: TAKUYA
 Arrangement: Keisuke Iizuka, TAKUYA
 Artist: Astronauts feat. SHIINA (Yoshiharu Shiina)
 Episodes: 21, 29, 48
 "ENDLESS PLAY" was originally solely the theme song for Kamen Rider: Climax Heroes Fourze. It is a solo performance by Yoshiharu Shiina as "Astronauts feat. SHIINA".
 "Evolvin' Storm"
 Lyrics: Shoko Fujibayashi
 Composition & Arrangement: tatsuo (of everset)
 Artist: everset
 Episodes: 28-30, 36
 "Evolvin' Storm" is Kamen Rider Meteor Storm's theme song. 
 "COSMIC MIND"
 Lyrics: Shoko Fujibayashi
 Composition & Arrangement: Shuhei Naruse
 Artist: Astronauts (May'n & Yoshiharu Shiina)
 Episodes: 32-35, 37, 40-46, 48
 "Cosmic Mind" is the theme song for Kamen Rider Fourze Cosmic States.

Other songs

 Artist: Yuki Jojima (Fumika Shimizu)
 Episodes: 3, 15, 16
A song Yuki made up to praise the Hayabusa satellite. A version including the Amanogawa High School Glee Club is featured on the series' second original soundtrack.
 
 Lyrics: Tsuyoshi Himura & Tenji Nagano
 Composition: Tenji Nagano
 Arrangement: Shuhei Naruse
 Artist: Kamen Rider Girls
 Episodes: 26, 48
 The Kamen Rider Girls make a guest appearance in episode 26 where they perform their cover of everset's "Saite". This was also used as the background song in episode 48 during the graduation scene of the final battle.

 Artist: Kamen Rider Club Band
 Episodes: 35
A rock variation of "Hayabusa-kun".
"Love is Overdrive"
 Lyrics: Shoko Fujibayashi
 Composition: DJ HURRY KENN
 Arrangement: AYANO (of FULL AHEAD)
 Artist: JK (Shion Tsuchiya)
 Episodes: 35, 36
 A song JK makes up under the alias of Gene. With the Capricorn Zodiarts's power, JK sing the "God and Gene version" of the song.

 Lyrics: Shoko Fujibayashi
 Composition: DJ HURRY KENN
 Arrangement: AYANO (of FULL AHEAD)
 Artist: JK (Shion Tsuchiya)
 Episodes: 36
 A song JK learned from his father.

The first soundtrack for Kamen Rider Fourze was released on December 21, 2011. A second soundtrack was later released on June 27, 2012. The Kamen Rider Fourze: Music States Collection' album, containing all vocal tracks from the series, was released on July 25, 2012. A special box collection was released on August 29, 2012, containing all of the songs and background music featured throughout the series and its films.

International broadcasts

References

External links

Official website at Toei TV
 

 
Fourze
Japanese high school television series
2011 Japanese television series debuts
2012 Japanese television series endings
Space adventure television series